Kotmanová is a village and municipality in the Lučenec District in the Banská Bystrica Region of Slovakia.

References

External links
 
 
https://web.archive.org/web/20090412234949/http://www.statistics.sk/mosmis/eng/run.html

Villages and municipalities in Lučenec District